Romania has participated in the Eurovision Song Contest 22 times since its debut in , and has placed in the top ten six times.

In , the year before its first appearance, Romania attempted to debut in the contest, but came last in the qualifying round. After successfully joining the following year, poor placements followed until 2002, resulting in several relegations.

Contest history

After having had broadcast the contest several times during the 1960s, 1970s, 1980s and early 1990s, Romania unsuccessfully attempted to debut in the 1993 contest, selecting "Nu pleca" by Dida Drăgan for the qualifying round ; Drăgan came in last place. A non-qualification was also achieved in  when there was a qualifying round for all countries excluding hosts Norway. The Eurovision site does not count either year in Romania's list of appearances. The country's first official participation occurred in 1994 when Dan Bittman's "Dincolo de nori" placed 21st in the contest's final.

In 2016, the European Broadcasting Union (EBU) suspended TVR from all EBU member services due to the repeated non-payment of debts and the threat of insolvency. This in turn disqualified their 2016 entry, "Moment of Silence" by Ovidiu Anton, from participating in the contest. Roxen was internally selected for 2021 nonetheless, performing "Amnesia".

Selection process and accolades

, a song contest which has been taking place every year in Romania except for 2021, has been used to select its entry for the contest. The first edition was held in 1993, with the winner chosen by 1100 households in the country. Since then, several voting procedures have been used, often combining televoting with the votes of a jury panel. The selection of the winner either occurred during one show, or through a varying amount of semi-finals. For the first time, a part of Romania's entry was determined internally in 2020. Roxen was selected by TVR out of exclusive partner Global Records's roster, and was appointed five songs for a jury and the public to choose from. The broadcaster and the label also collaborated the following year for the internal selection of Roxen and her entry.

A number of Romania's Eurovision entries have experienced commercial success over the years. While "Let Me Try" reached number nine on the Romanian Top 100, 's "Tornerò" by Mihai Trăistariu peaked within the top ten in Finland and Greece. "Llámame", the nation's 2022 entry, also peaked atop the charts in Romania.

Participation overview

Related involvement

Heads of delegation
The public broadcaster of each participating country in the Eurovision Song Contest assigns a head of delegation as the EBU's contact person and the leader of their delegation at the event. The delegation, whose size can greatly vary, includes a head of press, the contestants, songwriters, composers and backing vocalists, among others.

Stage directors
The appointed stage directors are responsible for directing the country's live performance, for camerawork and for the visuals used.

Jury members
A five-member jury panel consisting of music industry professionals is made up for every participating country for the semi-finals and final of the Eurovision Song Contest, ranking all entries except for their own country's contribution. The juries' votes constitute 50% of the overall result alongside televoting.

Commentators and spokespersons
For the show's broadcast on TVR, various commentators and dual commentators have been hired throughout the years, with Leonard Miron notably having done the job on seven occasions. At Eurovision, after all points are calculated, the presenters of the show call upon each voting country to invite their respective spokesperson to announce the results of their vote on-screen.

Conductors
In contests where an orchestra was provided, a conductor was required to lead the musicians during each country's performance. Broadcasters were able to provide their own conductors, or could call upon the services of the conductor appointed by the host broadcaster. For 1993's  pre-selection round, George Natsis conducted the Romanian entry. In 1994 and 1998, Irish host conductor Noel Kelehan and Romanian conductor Adrian Romcescualso the composer of "Eu cred"were hired, respectively.

Photo gallery

See also
Romania in the Eurovision Young Dancers
Romania in the Eurovision Young Musicians
Romania in the Junior Eurovision Song Contest
Romania in the Turkvision Song Contest

Notes

References

 
Countries in the Eurovision Song Contest